The Ontario Reign are a professional ice hockey team in the American Hockey League (AHL) that began play in the 2015–16 season. Based in Ontario, California, and affiliated with the National Hockey League's Los Angeles Kings, the team plays its home games at the Toyota Arena.

The franchise is a relocation of the former Manchester Monarchs AHL franchise when several other franchises created a Pacific Division in 2015. The team is owned by the Anschutz Entertainment Group. The Reign replaced the ECHL team of the same name, which played from 2008 until 2015, after which they moved to Manchester, New Hampshire, to play as the Manchester Monarchs.

History
On January 29, 2015, the Los Angeles Kings announced that they would be moving their AHL affiliate, the Manchester Monarchs, to Ontario as one of five charter members of the AHL's new Pacific Division.  The team retained the Reign nickname from its ECHL predecessor (which moved to Manchester and take on the Monarchs moniker, in essentially a "franchise swap"). The Reign's AHL logo, based on the Kings' 1980s-90s "Chevy" logo, was unveiled on Wednesday, February 11. The franchise retained head coach Mike Stothers during the move from Manchester.

In its inaugural season in California, the Reign won the first Pacific Division regular season title with a 44–19–4–1 record. Goaltender Peter Budaj was named to the 2015–16 AHL First All-Star Team and was selected as the league top goaltender with the Baz Bastien Memorial Award. Sean Backman lead the team in scoring with 21 goals and 34 assists while playing all 68 games for the Reign. The Reign would also win the division in the playoffs, defeating the San Jose Barracuda three-games-to-one and the San Diego Gulls four-games-to-one. In the conference finals, the Reign were swept by the eventual Calder Cup champion Lake Erie Monsters in four games.

During the next season in 2016–17, due to goaltender injuries and call-ups for their parent club, the Los Angeles Kings, the Reign ended up using a Canadian father-son duo Dusty and Jonah Imoo during a game in October 2016. Dusty Imoo (age 46) was a goaltending consultant with the Kings. Jonah (age 22) made his AHL debut on a tryout contract. Both the Imoos had grown up in Surrey, British Columbia. By the end of the season, the Reign qualified for the playoffs in third place in the Pacific Division, losing in the first round to San Diego.

The 2019–20 season was curtailed by the onset of the COVID-19 pandemic in March 2020. During the offseason, Stothers' contract was not renewed and was replaced by John Wroblewski as the new head coach. Approaching the delayed 2020–21 season, the Reign announced they would temporarily relocate and play out of the Kings' practice rink, Toyota Sports Center, in El Segundo due to pandemic-related restrictions. The Sports Center hosted all the Reign's home games closed to spectators.

Season-by-season records

Players

Current roster
Updated March 15, 2023.

|}

Team captains 

 Vincent LoVerde, 2015–17
 Brett Sutter, 2017–22
 T.J. Tynan, 2022–present

References

External links
 Ontario Reign official website

 
1
Ice hockey teams in California
Sports in Ontario, California
Sports in San Bernardino County, California
Sports in the Inland Empire
Ice hockey clubs established in 2015
2015 establishments in California